The 1915 Arfon by-election was a parliamentary by-election held on 6 July 1915 for the Arfon division of Caernarvonshire in North Wales, a constituency of the British House of Commons.

The by-election was caused by death at the age of 55 of the Liberal Member of Parliament (MP) William Jones, a Junior Lord of the Treasury in H. H. Asquith's Liberal government, who had held the seat since the 1895 general election.

The only candidate nominated to contest the by-election was the Liberal Caradoc Rees, who was therefore elected unopposed. Rees, who was a solicitor, held the seat until the constituency was abolished at the general election in December 1918 and was later appointed as a judge.

See also
 Arfon (UK Parliament constituency)
 1911 Arfon by-election
 Caernarvonshire
 List of United Kingdom by-elections

References

Sources

1915 in Wales
1910s elections in Wales
1915 elections in the United Kingdom
By-elections to the Parliament of the United Kingdom in Welsh constituencies
Unopposed by-elections to the Parliament of the United Kingdom in Welsh constituencies
Politics of Caernarfonshire
History of Caernarfonshire
July 1915 events